Jargaltkhaan is a sum (district) of Khentii Province in eastern Mongolia. In 2010, its population was 1,831.

Notable people
Byambasürengiin Sharav (1952-) -composer and pianist

References 

Districts of Khentii Province